Kelling (also known as Low Kelling and as  Lower Kelling) is a village and a civil parish in the English county of Norfolk. The village straddles the A149 Coast road between Kings Lynn and Great Yarmouth.

The villages name means 'Cylla's/Ceolla's people'.

The nearest railway station is at Sheringham for the Bittern Line which runs between Sheringham, Cromer, and Norwich. The nearest airport is Norwich International Airport. The village lies within the Norfolk Coast AONB (Area of Outstanding Natural Beauty) and the North Norfolk Heritage Coast.

Changes in government policy have discontinued management of coastal erosion in  North Norfolk.

Village amenities
Kelling is a small village (pop 177 in 2011), which had a reputation for smuggling. The village has a reading room, which is now a book shop, gallery and tea-room. There is a small Victorian school house built in 1876 and opened October 1877, still in use as a primary school today on the coastal side of the A149 just opposite the reading room.  Today it is attended by 90 children from the surrounding area. The postal addresses for Kelling are unusual as only 10 of the 37 properties have a number; the rest are known only by the house name the postcode for the village is NR25 7EL.

Around Kelling are Kelling Heath and Muckleburgh Hill, two raised areas of outstanding natural beauty. The heaths contain a network of paths, nature trail and views of the surrounding area. Kelling village is 1 km from the coast which is accessed via a road used as a public path (RUPP). The coastline at Kelling along with Weybourne and Salthouse was of part the strategic defence during the Second World War.

Images

See also
Kelling Hall
Home Place, Kelling
Kelling Heath

References

Neighbouring villages
Weybourne
Salthouse
High Kelling
Cley next the Sea
Wiveton

External links

Villages in Norfolk
North Norfolk
Civil parishes in Norfolk